Latvian Association for Support of Disabled People (LASDP) is non-profit organization founded in 2010 and based in Riga, Latvia. Association supports the rights and interests of Latvian people with disabilities, provides transportation and other services, including education and employment consulting. Since 2011 LASDP participates in international projects and activities in collaboration with other Latvian non-profit organizations and Ministry of Welfare of the Republic of Latvia.

Regional branches 
 Riga and Jurmala (Central office)
 Liepaja (Western Division)
 Rezekne (Eastern Division)
 Jelgava Planned in 2014

Projects and Activities
 Promotion of economic and social integration of disabled people
 Accessibility Research projects
 Educational services for disabled people
 Transportation services

References

External links
LASDP website
LASDP new website (under construction)
 *

Organizations established in 2010
Organisations based in Riga
Disability organisations based in Latvia
2010 establishments in Latvia